Florentino Torres High School, commonly known as Torres High School (THS), is located in Gagalangin, Tondo, Manila, Philippines. It is one of the oldest public schools in Metro Manila.

History

Founded by James T. Burns in 1925, Florentino Torres High School was originally named Legarda High School. With only three teachers, Burns opened the school to students who were refused admission by the three existing public high schools in Manila.

In 1926, the school moved to the Sequoia Building at the foot of Pritil Bridge along Juan Luna Street and was renamed Manila West High School. March 1928 marked the first group of students to graduate from the school as well as the initial appearance of various school clubs and organizations.
In 1930, several changes took place under the supervision of Marcelino Bautista, the first Filipino principal, who renamed the four Manila public high schools after the first four Filipino Justices of the Supreme Court:
 Manila West High School became Florentino Torres High School, in honor of Justice Florentino Torres, the first Associate Justice of the Supreme Court of the Philippines.
 Manila North High School became Arellano High School, in honor of Justice Cayetano Arellano
 Manila South High School became Araullo High School, in honor of Justice Manuel Araullo
 Manila East High School became V. Mapa High School, in honor of Justice Victorino Mapa
The maiden issue of The Torres Torch, the official school paper, was published in 1930.
In 1937, the school formally occupied the Constabulary Barracks in Gagalangin, where it is located today. With the outbreak of World War II in 1941, the school ceased operation, and the buildings were redeployed as garrisons. During this period, all school records were destroyed.

On July 16, 1945, the school re-opened with Pablo Reyes as principal. On November 24, 1945, the first post-Liberation group of 30 students received their diplomas. On October 16, 1953, the school first celebrated its foundation day under Mr. Cesario Bandong as the principal.

On the following years, Florentino Torres High School had continued giving quality education to the youth of Manila under Dr. Emiliano Rafael (1968-1972), Mr. Alfonso Asuncion (1973), Mr. Rufino dela Cruz (1974-1976) and Dr. Dominador Wingsing (1977).

In 1978, the first female principal came, Mrs. Severa Saldana. She started the open-shelf system in the library to give the students the freedom to learn. She was also the one who headed the repairs of the corridor, school offices, media room and canteen, for the Torresians and teachers to be more persevering and efficient.

In addition, many projects were finished under her term, like classrooms and buildings of the Technology and Home Economics department. After Saldana, the next principals who governed FTHS were Dr. Consolacion Domingo (1984), Dr. Florie Balanag (1986-1991), Ms. Adoracion Acuna (1991-1995), Mrs. Norma Escobar (1995-1998), and Mrs. Pilar Pizarro (1998-2001) that were really great principals who brought out the success and progress of the school.

Year 2001, when another principal started his term and was in the person of Dr. Romeo Santos, who brought a lot of changes in the school. Dr. Santos was known for his program "Five Senses Approach" in teaching, and also, his untiring supervision of ongoing classes as part of his effective management of the school. The "Open Gate Policy" was also implemented by Dr. Santos to fully organize the class schedule of the students, specially in the lower sections. Year 2003, when the FTHS was chosen by the Ayala Foundation in their project "Adopt-a-School Program" wherein the school received free computer equipment. In addition, Dr. Santos gave more excitement and color for the lives of third and fourth year students when he brought back the Juniors-Seniors Promenade.

Curriculum

Japanese Class

Through the Department of Education's "Special Program in Foreign Language" (SPFL) and The Japan Foundation, Manila, Florentino Torres High School currently offers Japanese classes for students from all year levels. The program focuses on Japanese language, arts, and culture, while featuring various activities such as a Sanshin workshop and the Kaisha Caravan.

Extracurricular activities

Student organizations, affectionately referred to as "orgs" by students, include various special interest clubs that conduct activities for the welfare and development of students:
Boy Scouts of the Philippines
Girl Scouts of the Philippines
YMCA
YWCA
UNESCO Club
Yes-O
Interact Club
Red Cross Youth
Shakespearean Club
Kapisanan ng Diwang Filipino
The Torres Thespians Club
FTHS Dancesport Club
FTHS Campus Troopers
THS Athletics Society
THS Campus Integrity Crusaders (CIC)
THS Student Technologists and Entrepreneurs of the Philippines
Future Homemakers of the Philippines (FHP)
Eco Waste Busters
Save Club
ESP Club
The Torres Torch
Ang Sulo
Marian Youth Movement (MYM)
Mary Help of Christians Crusaders
Lusog Isip ng Kabataan (LINK) Club
Campus Integrity Crusaders (CIC)
Nihongo Club
English Club
Math Wizards' Club
Science Club
Research Club
Robotics Club
Nihonggo Club
LitraTorres Photography Club

Headed by the Supreme Student Government, each club or organization serves as a certain subject area's Office for Student Affairs.  They initiate activities such as student-led projects.

Notable alumni
 Salvador Marino, former Secretary of the Department of Justice (Philippines)
 Dionisio L. Umali, Asia and Pacific Regional Representative, Food and Agriculture Organization of the United Nations (1972-1981)
 Fred DeAsis, International Artist, 2010 awardee, Commission on Filipinos Overseas (CFO) Presidential Award in the field of Arts and Culture.
 Raymundo Punongbayan, former Director of Philippine Institute of Volcanology and Seismology (PHIVOLCS)
 Francisco Arcellana, National Artist of the Philippines for Literature
 Josefina Navarro, former Superintendent of the Division of City Schools - Manila
 Isagani Yambot, Philippine Daily Inquirer publisher
 Andres Cristobal Cruz, author of the novel Ang Tundo Man May Langit Din
 Rodolfo Vera Quizon - Actor, comedian
 Renato Vibiesca, 2-time awardee of the Palanca Awards for Literature
 Jaime Lopez, former Congressman for the 2nd District of Manila
 Jerald Napoles - TV / Movie Actor

Former principals

Gallery

References

 The History of Florentino Torres High School - FTHS Yearbook 2010
 Florentino Torres High School General Alumni Foundation Inc. - https://www.facebook.com/groups/thsgafi/
 Torres High School Logo - https://www.flickr.com/photos/139634441@N08/38790551295/in/photostream/
 Torres High School Logo (Filipino Version) - https://www.flickr.com/photos/139634441@N08/27909597239/in/photostream/

1925 establishments in the Philippines
Educational institutions established in 1925
High schools in Manila
Education in Tondo, Manila